The Second Civil War is a satirical black comedy film made for the HBO cable television network and first shown on March 15, 1997.

Directed by Joe Dante, the film is a satire about anti-immigrant sentiment in the United States.

The film stars James Earl Jones, Elizabeth Peña, and Denis Leary as reporters for a CNN-like cable network, "News Net" (referred to in on-screen graphics as "NN"); Phil Hartman as the U.S. President; James Coburn as his chief political advisor; and William Schallert as the Secretary of Defense. Brian Keith portrayed a general in one of his final movie roles.

Plot
The film is set in a United States in which foreign immigration has skyrocketed:  The mayor of Los Angeles speaks only in Spanish, Rhode Island is populated mostly by Chinese-Americans, and Alabama has a congressman from India.  Politics is openly reduced to a matter of catering to various ethnic groups for their votes - the Alabama congressman will only support the U.S. President if his state receives more money for Hindu temples. When an atomic weapon is used on Pakistan by India, an international organization makes plans to bring orphans to Idaho.

Idaho Governor Jim Farley (Beau Bridges) orders the state's National Guard to close its borders, as Idaho has already received more than a million refugees; he acknowledges this even though the Governor himself routinely indulges in Mexican food, Mexican soap operas, and an affair with a Mexican-American reporter (Elizabeth Peña).  Despite the best efforts of his press secretary Jimmy Cannon (Kevin Dunn), Farley remains largely oblivious to the national crisis he's the center of, since Farley is more concerned with rekindling his romance with his mistress rather than dealing with national matters.

Meanwhile, the President of the United States (Phil Hartman) turns out to be an equally ineffectual leader, ruthlessly exploiting immigration to fill districts and states with those most likely to vote for his own party.  He will move more Koreans to New York since Koreans are one of his core constituencies. Reputed as indecisive, the President delegates his decision-making entirely to his advisors, most notably his unofficial chief advisor, lobbyist Jack B. Buchan (James Coburn).

Buchan, however, is less concerned with the good of the nation, and more concerned with politics, especially how the President's actions will play on television (resulting, for example, in a 72-hour deadline being shortened to 67 hours to prevent the news from interrupting Susan Lucci's farewell appearance on the soap opera All My Children).  Buchan regularly influences the President's decisions by manipulating his desire to emulate previous U.S. presidents, even going so far as to pepper presidential statements with fictitious "quotes" from President Dwight D. Eisenhower.

Meanwhile, the NewsNet cable network is reporting the events and influencing them at the same time.  News director Mel (Dan Hedaya) attempts to time events to maximize ratings, while his staff becomes polarized over the political issues involved in the conflict between the Governor and the President.  Standard fare for the cable network is to show footage of crying immigrant children, which is done with the Pakistani orphans waiting to move to Idaho.

As the deadline approaches, the Governor and the President call in, respectively, the Idaho National Guard and the United States Army.  Tensions rise when the commanders of both units turn out to be bitter rivals from the Gulf War.  Meanwhile, governors from other states send in their own National Guard units to aid one side or the other, causing the conflict to escalate into the national arena. Mexican-American pro-immigrant rioters bomb the Alamo, while anti-immigrant rioters retaliate by bombing the Statue of Liberty because of its plaque, stating that "We no longer want your tired, your poor or your huddled masses."

Eventually, the Governor's girlfriend convinces him to back down from the conflict and resign, but a series of misunderstandings and mutinies leads to a major battle between anti- and pro-immigrant armed forces at the Idaho border, culminating with the president's decision to invade Idaho in what becomes the Second American Civil War.  At the movie's close, news reports indicate that hostilities have ceased, but the immigration issue is unresolved.

Cast
 Beau Bridges as Gov. Jim Farley
 Joanna Cassidy as Helena Newman
 Phil Hartman as The President
 James Earl Jones as Jim Kalla
 James Coburn as Jack Buchan
 Dan Hedaya as Mel Burgess
 Elizabeth Peña as Christina
 Denis Leary as Vinnie Franko
 Ron Perlman as Alan Manieski
 William Schallert as Secretary of Defense
 Kevin McCarthy as Chief of Staff
 Catherine Lloyd Burns as Amelia Sims
 Kevin Dunn as Jimmy Cannon
 Shelley Malil as Congressman Singh
 Larry "Flash" Jenkins as Kenya Nkomo
 Dick Miller as Eddie O'Neill
 Brian Keith as Maj. Gen. Charles Buford
 Richard Gross as Militia Leader
 Roger Corman as Sandy Collins
 Hank Stratton as Blaine Gorman
 Alexandra Wilson as Caroline Dawes
 Johnny Luckett as Captain
 Jerry Hardin as Col. McNally
 Dave Georgi as Major
 Dana Lee as Chinese Colonel
 Stogie Kenyatta Firing Squad Officer
 Sean Lawlor as Brendan
 Leah Gale as White House Reporter
 Dwight D. Eisenhower as Himself (archive footage)
 Ronald Reagan as Himself - At Statue of Liberty Re-dedication (archive footage)
 Nancy Reagan as Herself - At Statue of Liberty Re-dedication (archive footage)
 John Wesley as Chairman of the Joint Chiefs
 Ben Masters as Matthew Langford
 Rance Howard as Arnold Tooney Jr
 Robert Picardo as Godfrey
 Jim Lau as Chinese Congressman
 Nathaniel Goodman as Christina's Cameraman
 Jodi Verdu as NewsNet Technician #1
 Jamison Yang as NewsNet Technician #2
 Paul Guyot as NewsNet Technician #3
 Terry Knight as Boise Reporter
 Anthony Lee as Steven Kingsley
 Eve Brenner as Elderly Militia Woman
 Scott Atkinson as Young Militia Man
 Christine Jane Newman as Militia Child
 Sonny Skyhawk (Charles Brito) as Indian
 Darryl Van Leer as Mohammed Amin

Release
The film was shown in theaters in Italy, Portugal, the Netherlands and France in 1997 and 1998, before being released to home video. In Australia, the film was released directly to video in April / May 1998.

The DVD was released in 2005.

Beau Bridges won the 1997 Emmy Award for Outstanding Supporting Actor in a Miniseries or a Special.

References

External links

1997 films
1990s Spanish-language films
1997 comedy-drama films
American comedy-drama films
Films about immigration to the United States
Films about television people
American political satire films
HBO Films films
Films directed by Joe Dante
Films scored by Hummie Mann
Films with screenplays by Martyn Burke
Second American Civil War speculative fiction
1990s English-language films
1990s American films